Henry Fork may refer to:

Henry Fork, Virginia, a census-designated place
Henry Fork (West Virginia), a river
Henry Fork (South Fork Catawba River tributary), a river in North Carolina

See also
 Henrys Fork (disambiguation)